Twisted Sister was an American heavy metal band from Ho-Ho-Kus, New Jersey. Formed in late December 1972 as cover band Silver Star, the group changed its name to Twisted Sister in February 1973 and originally included lead vocalist Michael "Valentine" O'Neill, guitarists Jay Jay French and Billy "Diamond" Stiger, bassist Kenny Neill and drummer Mel "Starr" Anderson. The band took a short hiatus in December 1974, after O'Neill instigated a fight with Anderson and threatened to shoot the drummer. They returned early the following year with new vocalist Frank "Rick Prince" Karuba and guitarist Keith "Angel" Angelino (in place of Stiger), although both had left before the end of the year, with French and Angelino's replacement Eddie "Fingers" Ojeda taking over lead vocal duties temporarily before another short hiatus.

By February 1976, Twisted Sister had returned with new frontman Dee Snider and drummer Kevin John Grace. Tony Petri took over on drums a few months later. Neill left two years later in December 1978, with his place taken by Mark "The Animal" Mendoza. The band changed drummers three more times in the early 1980s, first when Richie Teeter replaced Petri in December 1980, followed by Joey Brighton in April 1981, and finally by Anthony "A. J." Pero in April 1982. The lineup of Snider, French, Ojeda, Mendoza and Pero released four studio albums between 1982 and 1985, before Pero left in 1986 to rejoin his former band Cities. He was replaced by Joey "Seven" Franco, who performed on the group's last album Love Is for Suckers before breaking up in early 1988, following Snider's departure in October 1987.

Twisted Sister reunited in 1998 to record "Heroes Are Hard to Find" for the film Strangeland, written and co-produced by Snider. The band reformed again to perform live for the first time in 14 years at New York Steel in November 2001, a benefit concert for organisations affected by the September 11 attacks. A more permanent reunion followed in 2003, spawning new studio recordings and live releases. The band retained the same lineup until March 2015, when Pero died of a heart attack while touring with Adrenaline Mob. Following the drummer's death, the band announced that it was to embark on a final tour before breaking up in 2016, enlisting Mike Portnoy to take over for (late)A.J. Pero. The final Twisted Sister show took place on November 12, 2016, in Monterrey, Mexico at the Corona Northside Rock Park Meeting Fest.

The band reuinted on January 26, 2023 playing a 3 song set for their induction into the Metal Hall of Fame. The line up consisted of inductees Dee Snider, Jay Jay French and Mark Mendoza with Mike Portnoy filling in for inductee A.J. Pero and Keith Robert War filling in for inductee Eddie Ojeda.

Members

Most prominent lineup

Other members

Timeline

Lineups

References

External links
Twisted Sister official website

Twisted Sister